The Bangor Bypass is a road in New South Wales, Australia, between New Illawarra Road and River Road, bypassing Bangor and Menai. Completed in February 2005, it replaced Menai Road as the main road between A6 and River Road, alleviating traffic on Menai Road and increasing travel speed through Bangor and Menai. It also acts as a western extension of River Road and Woronora Bridge, which was completed four years earlier in 2001.  A section of New Illawarra Road north of the bypass was also completed as part of the project, linking the bypass directly to Alfords Point Road.

Stage 2 of the bypass project, commenced in 2009 and completed in early 2011, extended the Stage 1 New Illawarra Road southwards and joined it with the rest of New Illawarra Road at Barden Ridge, allowing the then Metroad 6 (now A6) to bypass Old Illawarra Road.

History
The bypass project had been planned many years earlier (mid 1990s) During the years of planning a misunderstanding by residential developers led to new roads and housing being constructed on Roads and Traffic Authority (RTA) land at the end of Anzac Road in Bangor. This caused the proposed position of the bypass to shift slightly north 

Preparations for the Bangor Bypass included changing traffic flow between Bangor, Woronora and Sutherland. This was largely due to a stretch of road known as the "Woronora bends", a collection of steep hairpin bends along Menai Rd. In June 1990, a changeover from the bends shifted traffic from Menai Rd onto a small stretch of Akuna Avenue and a new road called River Road. In 2001, traffic was shifted onto an extended River Road via the new Woronora River Bridge, replacing Menai Road via the older Woronora Bridge. The Bangor Bypass stage 1 commenced construction afterwards in 2003, and the bypass was completed in February 2005.

See also

References

External links 
Bangor Bypass at RTA website
Bangor Bypass RTA Maps
Bangor Bypass Stage 2 options

Roads in New South Wales
Bypasses in Australia